Patrick Ragland served as the 16th Secretary of State of Alabama from 1872 to 1873.

Before Ragland was Secretary of State, he was librarian of the Alabama Supreme Court Library from 1868 to 1872.

References

Alabama Republicans
Secretaries of State of Alabama
American librarians
Year of birth missing
Year of death missing